Longhai may refer to:

Longhai District, a district in Zhangzhou, Fujian, China
Longhai Campaign, 1946 campaign during Chinese Civil War
Longhai Railway, China's east–west railway artery